iDrive may refer to:

 iDrive, a BMW vehicle control system 
 International Drive, a road in Orlando, Florida, US
 IDrive Inc., based in Los Angeles County, US

See also
 iDisk, an Apple file hosting service 
 i-drive, (1998-2000), based in San Francisco, US